The following lists events that happened during 1970 in Laos.

Incumbents
Monarch: Savang Vatthana 
Prime Minister: Souvanna Phouma

Events

March
9 March - Operation Diamond Arrow ends.

September
11-13 September - Operation Tailwind

References

 
1970s in Laos
Years of the 20th century in Laos
Laos
Laos